Agathotoma temporaria is a species of sea snail, a marine gastropod mollusk in the family Mangeliidae.

Description
The length of the shell attains 4.4 mm.

Distribution
This species occurs in the Atlantic Ocean off Angola.

References

 Rolán E. & Otero-Schmitt J. (1999). The family Turridae s. l. (Molluscs, Neogastropoda) in Angola. 2. Subfamily Mangeliinae Fischer, 1883. Argonauta 13(1): 5-26

External links
  Tucker, J.K. 2004 Catalog of recent and fossil turrids (Mollusca: Gastropoda). Zootaxa 682:1-1295.

Endemic fauna of Angola
temporaria
Gastropods described in 1999